Cappagh is a Gaelic Athletic Association (GAA) club in County Kildare, Republic of Ireland.  It was the Kildare club of the year in 1998.

History
Cappagh was founded by Paddy Butler and John Murray in the aftermath of the Easter Rising. Their grounds in Ballyvauneen, southwest of Cappagh, were purchased in 1971 and their dressing room complex opened in 1995.

Gaelic Football
Kerryman Tadhg Downey played at corner forward on the 1939 Kildare championship team. At Downey’s behest, Cappagh adopted the red jerseys of the Dingle club, worn by Kerry in the 1938 All Ireland final. They amalgamated with Kilcock 1938-41 and 1955-62 Jim Daly and Pat Lyons played on the Kildare team in 1950.

Hurling
Under 15's down to Nursery.

Hurling was introduced at Nursery level in 2010 by current hurling coordinator Tom Murray. They won their first hurling trophy with their u12 div 4 in 2015. On the same day their u12 team in Div 2 narrowly lost to Kilcock in their final. They were also name hurling club of the year by Kildare north Board. This was followed up with the u12 winning div 2 in 2016 and being promoted to div 1 for the following year. In 2016 Cappagh amalgamated with Broadford at u14, under the name Northern Gaels. They played in Féile and lost to Celbridge in the final and went on to win the shield final in the shield again against Celbridge. The Northern Gaels followed this up with winning the shield final in the u15 in the autumn 2016.

Camogie
Founded on 5 October March 1972 by Molly O’Donoghue and Lena Downey winners of 20 titles at under-age level and are the only camogie club to have their own pitch. The original club colours were grey and white, now grey red and white. Cappagh hosted the National League Division 2 final of 1980. In 1978 they became the first club in Kildare to achieve the Kildare Senior Camogie Championship- Kildare Junior Camogie Championship double.

Honours
 Kildare Intermediate Football Championship (1) 1946 Finalists 1944
 Leinster Leader Cup Finalists 1946
 Kildare Junior B Football Championship (2) 1975, 1990 Finalists 1978
 Kildare Junior Football Championship Finalists 1942
 Kildare Senior Football League Division 3: Champions (1) 1977
 Kildare Junior C Football Championship (1) 1975
 Kildare Junior 7-A-Side Championship (1) 2005
 The Leinster Leader Junior Club Cup (2) 1997, 2006
 Bord na nÓg Football Under 13s Div4 League Champions (1) 2009
Bord na nOg Football under 14 Div 4 League Champions 2010.
Féile DivC Football Champions 2011
 Kildare Ladies football Under 13's Div3 Championship (1) 2014
 Kildare Under-12 Div. Championship (1) 2015
 Kildare Camogie Under-21 Championship (1) 2015
 Kildare Camogie senior shield Championship (1) 2015.
 Kildare Under-12 Hurling Div. 2 Championship (1) 2016
 Kildare Under-12 Shield Championship - Northern Gaels (Cappagh & Broadford amalgamation) Spring 2016.
 Kildare Under-15 Shield Championship Northern Gaels Autumn 2016
 Kildare Camogie Under-12 Championship (1) 2017

Bibliography
 Kildare GAA: A Centenary History, by Eoghan Corry, CLG Chill Dara, 1984,  hb  pb
 Kildare GAA yearbook, 1972, 1974, 1978, 1979, 1980 and 2000- in sequence especially the Millennium yearbook of 2000
 Soaring Sliothars: Centenary of Kildare Camogie 1904-2004 by Joan O'Flynn Kildare County Camogie Board.

External links
Kildare GAA site
Kildare GAA club sites
Kildare on Hoganstand.com

Gaelic games clubs in County Kildare
Gaelic football clubs in County Kildare